Natural History of the Canary Islands is an illustrated reference work of the natural history of the Canary Islands. It was written by the English botanist Philip Barker-Webb and the French naturalist and ethnologist Sabin Berthelot, in cooperation with several other scientists. It was published in Paris between 1836 and 1850. The work is considered the most important 19th century text about the Canary Islands in the field of natural sciences.

The work consists of three main parts and nine volumes:
Volume 1-1: ethnography and the annals of conquest 
Volume 1-2: Canarian miscellany (travel, excursions, various observations etc.) 
Volume 2-1: geography, statistics and geology 
Volume 2-2: zoology 
Volume 3-1: botanical geography  
Volume 3-2: Canarian phytography (in 4 volumes) 

Most of the work is written in French, except the phytography part, which consists of scientific descriptions of plants  in Latin.

References

External links
Histoire Naturelle des Îles Canaries full text at Biodiversity Heritage Library

1836 books
Natural history books
Biota of the Canary Islands